Rio Vista Dam is a dam on the San Marcos River in San Marcos, Texas. The flood of 1998 badly damaged the dam.

Following a US$2.1 million project, Recreation Engineering and Planning (REP) was commissioned to reconstruct the failing dam to enhance existing usage for recreational visitors and tourists alike while improving a stimulant of the local economy. REP was capable of providing a design which was tailored to the needs of the Rio Vista Dam which drastically reduced the reconstruction costs from $1.8 million to $500,000. The reconstruction efforts done by KBR, included removing the failing concrete side walls, grading the banks down to the water, and the addition of artificial rapids. REP completed the project in just under four months when the park reopened on May 25, 2006.

Rio Vista Park
The Rio Vista Park is a  park located on the dam, which serves as a local hotspot for swimming, tubing, canoeing, and kayaking.

Notes 

Dams in Texas
San Marcos, Texas
Buildings and structures in San Marcos, Texas
United States local public utility dams
Dams completed in 1904
1904 establishments in Texas